Of Truth and Sacrifice is the ninth studio album by German extreme metal band Heaven Shall Burn, released on 20 March 2020 through Century Media Records. The album consists of two parts; volume one titled "Of Truth" with ten tracks and volume two called "Of Sacrifice" with nine tracks. Both parts include all but one original song; on volume two the band covered Nuclear Assault's 1989 song "Critical Mass". At 97 minutes runtime, the band released their longest album to date.

The album was supported by the singles "Weakness Leaving My Heart", "Protector" and "My Heart and the Ocean" released in January and February 2020, respectively. The music video for "Eradicate" was made by famed Ugandan ultra-low budget studio Wakaliwood.

Commercially, the album debuted at number one in Germany, becoming the band's first album to do so.

Track listing

Charts

Year-end charts

References

2020 albums
Heaven Shall Burn albums
Century Media Records albums